The Royal Automobile Museum (Arabic: متحف السيارات الملكي) is an automobile museum in Amman, Jordan.

History
Located next to the Al Hussein Public Parks, the museum was established in 2003 upon King Abdullah's wishes. The museum showcases a rare collection of Jordan's vehicles ranging from Hussein bin Ali's cars that came to Amman in 1916 to modern sports cars.

The museum has the rover used in filming of Hollywood's movie The Martian, which used Jordan's UNESCO world heritage site Wadi Rum as the backdrop for the Martian scenes. The rover was gifted to Jordan in return for the hospitality with which Jordan extended to the movie cast and crew.

References

External links
 
 Royal Automobile Museum website

2003 establishments in Jordan
Museums established in 2003
Museums in Amman
Automotive museums